This is a complete list of the operas of the German composer Johann Adolph Hasse (1699–1783).

List

Sources

External links
 

 
Lists of operas by composer
Lists of compositions by composer